Robert I (1011 – 21 March 1076), known as Robert the Old and "", was Duke of Burgundy from 1032 to his death. Robert was the son of King Robert II of France and Constance of Arles. His brother was Henry I of France.

Life
In 1025, with the death of his eldest brother Hugh Magnus, he and Henry rebelled against their father and defeated him, forcing him back to Paris. In 1031, after the death of his father the king, Robert participated in a rebellion against his brother, in which he was supported by his mother, Constance of Arles. Peace was only achieved when Robert was given Burgundy (1032).

Throughout his reign, he was little more than a robber baron who had no control over his vassals, whose estates he often plundered, especially those of the Church.  He seized the income of the diocese of Autun and the wine of the canons of Dijon. He burgled the abbey of St-Germain at Auxerre. In 1048, he repudiated his wife, Helie of Semur followed by the assassination of her brother Joceran and the murdering of her father, Lord Dalmace I of Semur, with his own hands.  In that same year, the bishop of Langres, Harduoin, refused to dedicate the church of Sennecy so as not "to be exposed to the violence of the duke."

His first son, Hugh, died in battle at a young age and his second son, Henry, also predeceased him.  He was succeeded by Henry's eldest son, his grandson, Hugh I.

Family

He married his first wife, Helie of Semur, about 1033, and repudiated her in 1048. Robert and Helie had five children:
Hugh (1034–1059), killed in battle
Henry (1035–ca.1074). He died shortly before his father, thus making his son Robert's heir. His children included Hugh I, Duke of Burgundy (1057–1093), Odo I, Duke of Burgundy (1058–1103), and Henry, Count of Portugal (1066–1112), among others
Robert (1040–1113), poisoned; married Violante, daughter of Roger I of Sicily
Simon (1045–1087)
Constance (1046–1093), married Alfonso VI of León and Castile
From his second wife, Ermengarde, daughter of Fulk III of Anjou, he had one daughter:
Hildegarde (c.1056–1104), married William VIII of Aquitaine

References

Sources

Gwatking, H. M., Whitney, J. P., et al. Cambridge Medieval History: Volume III—Germany and the Western Empire. Cambridge University Press: London, 1930.

House of Burgundy
Dukes of Burgundy
1011 births
1076 deaths
Rebellious princes
Sons of kings